Bethartoli South is a mountain of the Garhwal Himalaya in Uttarakhand, India.The elevation of Bethartoli South is  and its prominence is . It is 117th highest located entirely within the Uttrakhand. Nanda Devi, is the highest mountain in this category. It is situated in the Nanda Devi sanctuary. It lies 1.3 km south of Bethartoli  its nearest higher neighbor. It is 17 km west of Nanda Devi and it lies 8.9 km NW of Devistan .

Climbing history
The Bavarian brothers, Adolf and Fritz Hieber, and A lawyer from Bombay, Keki Bunshah, with Sherpa Gyalzen Minchung and his brother Wangdi attempted and climbed a few peaks in Garhwal during june, 1956. The Hiebers attempted Bethartholi’s northeast ridge, but Fritz Hieber and Gyalzen summited the Bethartoli south peak, 20,729 feet. This is the first ascent of this peak.

The Climbers Club, Bombay expedition led by Professor Ramesh G. Desai summited Bethartoli South, on 4 June 1970 the summiters were R. G. Desai Harish Kapadia, Chhawang Tashi and Phurba Tharkey. This is the second ascent of Bethartoli south.

A team from the Assam Mountaineering Association led by Atanu Prasad Barua climbed Bethartoli South on September 28 1970. The summit was reached by Rohini Kumar Bhuyan, Khagendra Nath Bora, Instructor Sher Singh and Sherpas Pemba Tarkay, Nima Tenzing and Nima Dorje. They reached the summit from Camp II at 19,400 feet. They established Base Camp at 14,900 feet in the Nanda Devi Sanctuary on September 22. This is the third ascent of Bethartoli south.

Neighboring and subsidiary peaks
Neighboring or subsidiary peaks of Bethartoli South:
 Bethartoli: 
 Nanda Devi: 
 Trisul: 
 Devistan II: 
 Devtoli: 
 Tharkot:

Glaciers and rivers
On the southern side lies Bethartoli Glacier. On the western side lies Ronti Glacier and Nanda Ghunti Glacier. All this Glacier drains down to Dhauli Ganga one of the main tributaries of river Alaknanda River. Dhauli Ganga later joins Alaknanda River at Vishnu Prayag the other main tributaries of river Ganga. Alaknanda river merge with Bhgirathi River at Dev Prayag and called Ganga there after.

See also
 List of Himalayan peaks of Uttarakhand

References

Mountains of Uttarakhand
Six-thousanders of the Himalayas
Geography of Chamoli district